Sherdils (Urdu: ﺸﻴر دﻝ English: Lion Hearts) is the aerobatics display team of the Pakistan Air Force (PAF) & Royal Pakistan Air Scouts (RPAS). The Sherdils are based at the Pakistan Air Force Academy, Risalpur, Pakistan and consist of nine Karakoram K-8P aircraft.

Pilots of the Sherdils are not dedicated aerobatics pilots like other famous aerobatics teams. Sherdils draw their pilots from jet flying instructors at the PAF Academy's Advanced Jet Training Squadron. They have an additional role to prepare and conduct formation aerobatics at various national and international events apart from regularly training young pilots on advanced jet trainers.

History 

The team was officially formed on 17 August 1972 as a result of efforts by an academy instructor, Sqn Ldr Bahar-ul-haq. The team was formed on the lines of Red Pelicans, the aerobatics team of RAF College, Cranwell where Bahar had been on an exchange tour. It was decided to put up a brief show on graduation parades as a demonstration of the professional skills of academy instructors. After several trials of candidate instructors, a team was formed under the command of 1965 War hero, Wg Cdr Imtiaz Bhatti. He was the Officer Commanding of the BFT wing at that time.  Other formation members included Flt Lt Aamer Ali Sharieff, Flt Lt A Rahim Yusufzai and Flt Lt Niaz Nabi, the latter becoming a most durable master of the ‘slot’ position. The initial performances of the team were highly successful. The "Tweety birds" performed at air shows for foreign dignitaries, including heads of state and military officers. Initially, the team had no name. The personal call sign of the leaders also denoted the team; it flew as ‘Sherdils’ for the first time on 19 September 1974. Sherdils Aerobatics team was enhanced to 6 ship T-37 aircraft team in March, 2004 under the leadership of Wg Cdr Tariq Chaudhary, OC BFT Wing.  The team was further increased to 9 ship for the first time on 2 October 2004 under the pioneer leadership of Wg Cdr Vaqar Ali Qureshi, OC No 1 BFT Squadron. This was a historical milestone for PAF as it brought international fame and respect among the community of nations. Despite the limited power of T-37 aircraft engines to handle such a big formation especially the outer wings was a daunting task. The problem was catered by anticipation and flawless professionalism by the instructors of Basic Flying Training Wing flying in the team. The pioneer 9 Ship Sherdils team members were Wg Cdr Vaqar (Ldr), Flt Lt Armughan (No 2), Flt Lt Nusrat (No 3), Sqn Ldr Tariq Azeem (No 4 slot/deputy ldr), Sqn Ldr Nasir (No 5), Sqn Ldr Sohail (No 6), Sqn Ldr Zahid (No 7), Flt Lt Hammad (No 8) and Sqn Ldr Tanveer (No 9).
The only unfortunate accident which T-37 Sherdils team ever met in their illustrious performance was in October 1978 and lost one aircraft and its leader Flt Lt Alamdar. Other formation members at the time were Flt Lt Shahid Nisar (No 2 & Deputy Lead), Flt Lt Irfan Masum (No 3) and Flt Lt Tasneem (No 4 slot).

The Sherdils transitioned to the newer and more modern Karakoram K-8P aircraft, jointly developed by Pakistan and China. A four-ship K-8P aircraft performed for the first time in November 2009 at PAF Academy Risalpur under the leadership of Squadron Leader Amir Misbah. Other team members were Squadron Leader Khalid Matin (Slot member), Squadron Leader Wajahat Syed (Left Wing) and Squadron Leader Nasir Zia (Right Wing).

By the Springs of 2010, Sherdils increased from 4-ship to 7-ship and perform at the closing ceremony of Exercise High-Mark 2010 under the leadership of Wing Commander Syed Ali Zaidi. Soon it transformed into 9-ship team and performed at the Graduation ceremony in May 2010.

In October 2010, led by Squadron Leader Khalid Matin, 9-Ship Sherdils performed at Graduation ceremony Risalpur again before leaving for its first ever International Participation at Zhuhai Air-Show, China from 16 to 21 November that year. Since then, Sherdils have performed at every Graduation Ceremony of PAF Academy Risalpur and regularly participates in various National and International events.

Formation style 
With T-37s, the type of formation and sequence virtually remained the same since the team's inception – line astern to the diamond formation during a loop, then clover-leaf, steep turn, barrel roll and finally, the breath-taking bomb-burst. Attempts were made to increase the number of aircraft in the team, but engine thrust demands were excessive for the outer formation members to cope with. A four aircraft diamond has thus remained the basic formation of the ‘Sherdils’for almost three decades.

In 2004, the number of aircraft in the main formation were increased to six initially, performing loops in delta formation, barrel roll and steep turn in double arrow-head formation. It was increased to Nine in October, 2004 with change in formation sequence and aerobatics. Most of the evasive manoeuvers for safety of formation members were developed during this time. The outclass skill, precision and smooth handling remained the hallmark of this formation throughout its history.

In 2009, the team shifted onto the K-8P aircraft. At present, the team comprises nine aircraft, with six ship main-team. Rest three aircraft perform the initial run-in and break-off in a linear bomburst over the venue.

Since early 2017, Sherdil team has enhanced its basic display sequence with addition of more thrilling maneuvers.

Paint scheme 

Appreciating the important quality affecting display aircraft i.e., appearance, the T-37s were painted all red. However, maintenance of the red-painted aircraft without the costly polyurethane coating became a problem. The team reverted to the all-metal finish, with only the nose, wing tips and tail painted day-glow orange. In 1980, with the induction of six ex-USAF T-37s, which were polyurethane-coated all white, ‘Sherdils’ became a logical choice for a new titillating appearance. The dramatic ‘sunburst’ paint scheme was adopted, red rays on an all-white background. Later, the aircraft were again painted red, but with the rays in white, a scheme that is in vogue today. Coloured smoke has been used to enhance the aesthetic qualities of the formation; smoke trails give the impression of multicoloured ribbons twirling in the sky.

Up until 2017 Sherdils' K-8P aircraft were painted in the overall white color scheme with red and blue stripes.

The team publicly revealed its current color scheme at an airshow held on the country's 70th Independence day celebrations held at Islamabad on 14 August; an all-white fuselage with green covering the entire vertical stabiliser and continuing along the upper fuselage all the way to the nose, a crescent and star on the tail and the team's name written in typeface underneath.

See also
Pakistan Air Force Academy
Aerobatics

References

External links

 PAF s' Aerobatics Profile
 PAF Sherdils Aerobatic Team

Aerobatic teams
Pakistan Air Force squadrons